is a passenger railway station in located in the city of Owase, Mie Prefecture, Japan, operated by Central Japan Railway Company (JR Tōkai).

Lines

Station layout
The station consists of a single island platform connected to the station building by a level crossing. The small station building dates from the original construction of the line. The station is unattended.

Platforms

History 
Ōsoneura Station opened on 12 January 1957 as a station on the Japan National Railways (JNR) Kisei East Line, which was renamed the Kisei Main Line on 15 July 1959.  The station has been unattended since 21 December 1983. The station was absorbed into the JR Central network upon the privatization of the JNR on 1 April 1987.

Passenger statistics
In fiscal 2019, the station was used by an average of 6 passengers daily (boarding passengers only).

Surrounding area
Mie Prefecture Kumano Kodo Visitor Center

See also
List of railway stations in Japan

References

External links

  JR Central timetable 

Railway stations in Japan opened in 1957
Railway stations in Mie Prefecture
Owase, Mie